The Ukrainian Grey (Sira ukrayin'ska) is an ancient breed of Podolian cattle from Ukraine. This hardy breed has been used for meat and draught power, and is similar to other European steppe cattle breeds such as the Hungarian Grey and the Italian Podolica.

History 

The Ukrainian Grey has been shown by studies of microsatellite data to be a very ancient one, as are some other related breeds of Grey Steppe cattle such as the Serbian Steppe. Until the beginning of the twentieth century the Ukrainian Grey was the principal cattle breed of Ukraine. It was hardy, frugal and well adapted to the steppe environment, and was used principally as a draught animal; when heavy horses began to replace oxen in agriculture in the nineteenth century, the breed started to decline. A herd-book was started in 1935, at which time it represented about 6.4% of the total cattle population in Ukraine.

A conservation programme was begun in the 1960s, and two conservation herds were established, one at Polivanovka in Dnipropetrovsk Oblast and another at Askania-Nova in Kherson Oblast; in 1982 a small herd of 125 animals was moved from Askania-Nova to Cherga in the Altai Republic. Numbers since the 1980s have been low, at around 1000 head or less, and in 2007 the conservation status of the breed was listed by the FAO as "critical". In 2011 the total number in three conservation herds was 1188, with 32 bulls and 440 breeding cows. The Ukrainian Grey is included in the Ark of Taste of the Slow Food Foundation.

Characteristics 

In this primitive breed, both cows and bulls have horns, as well as grey hides which are their namesake.

Use 

In the Soviet era of Ukrainian history, the Ukrainian Grey was much used for cross-breeding with other breeds. It contributed to the Lebedin, the Red Steppe, and the Ukrainian Simmental. The extinct Malakan breed of Turkey derived from the Ukrainian Grey.

References 

Cattle breeds originating in Ukraine
Cattle breeds